The 1933 Washington Senators was a season in American baseball. They won 99 games, lost 53, and finished in first place in the American League. It was the third and final pennant of the franchise while based in Washington. The team was managed by Joe Cronin and played home games at Griffith Stadium. They lost the best-of-seven World Series in 5 games to the New York Giants.

It would be the last time a Major League Baseball postseason series would be held in Washington until the 2012 season.  The Senators franchise, which moved to Minneapolis–St. Paul after the  season, has since won three American League pennants (1965; 1987; 1991) and two World Series (1987 and 1991) as the Minnesota Twins. The Series also marked the last time the nation's capital hosted a World Series game until the Washington Nationals -- spiritual successors to the Senators -- played in and ultimately won the 2019 World Series over the Houston Astros in seven games.

Regular season 
Player-manager Cronin was selected to the All-Star team as the starting shortstop and finished second in MVP voting. He also led the Senators with 118 runs batted in. 19-year-old infielder Cecil Travis had five hits in his major league debut.

Season standings

Record vs. opponents

Roster

Player stats

Batting

Starters by position 
Note: Pos = Position; G = Games played; AB = At bats; H = Hits; Avg. = Batting average; HR = Home runs; RBI = Runs batted in

Other batters 
Note: G = Games played; AB = At bats; H = Hits; Avg. = Batting average; HR = Home runs; RBI = Runs batted in

Pitching

Starting pitchers 
Note: G = Games pitched; IP = Innings pitched; W = Wins; L = Losses; ERA = Earned run average; SO = Strikeouts

Other pitchers 
Note: G = Games pitched; IP = Innings pitched; W = Wins; L = Losses; ERA = Earned run average; SO = Strikeouts

Relief pitchers 
Note: G = Games pitched; W = Wins; L = Losses; SV = Saves; ERA = Earned run average; SO = Strikeouts

Awards and honors

All-Stars 
Joe Cronin, starter, shortstop
Alvin Crowder, reserve, pitcher

League top five finishers 
Joe Cronin
 #4 in AL in RBI (118)

Alvin Crowder
 MLB leader in wins (24)

Joe Kuhel
 #4 in AL in stolen bases (17)

Heinie Manush
 #2 in AL in batting average (.336)
 #3 in AL in runs scored (115)

Earl Whitehill
 #3 in AL in wins (22)

1933 World Series

Game 1 
October 3, 1933, at the Polo Grounds in New York City

Game 2 
October 4, 1933, at the Polo Grounds in New York City

Game 3 
October 5, 1933, at Griffith Stadium in Washington, D.C.

Game 4 
October 6, 1933, at Griffith Stadium in Washington, D.C.

Game 5 
October 7, 1933, at Griffith Stadium in Washington, D.C.

Farm system

Notes

References 
1933 Washington Senators at Baseball-Reference
1933 Washington Senators team page at www.baseball-almanac.com

Minnesota Twins seasons
Washington Senators season
American League champion seasons
Wash